The 1957 Commonwealth Prime Ministers' Conference was the ninth Meeting of the Heads of Government of the Commonwealth of Nations. It was held in the United Kingdom in June 1957, and was hosted by that country's Prime Minister, Harold Macmillan.

The new Canadian prime minister, John Diefenbaker, proposes the intensification of trade relations within the Commonwealth. His call for an Empire Trade Conference were resisted by the British government which has an eye towards the UK developing stronger trade relations with Europe and the newly formed European Economic Community; the impact of the UK joining a European free trade area and its possible consequences on Commonwealth trade was a matter of concern. A Commonwealth Trade and Economic Conference is called for the next year.

The aftermath of the Suez Crisis and invasion of Hungary of the previous year were also discussed with the Commonwealth leaders calling for the strengthening of the United Nations as an instrument of peace. The Suez Crisis had badly split the Commonwealth resulting in India, Pakistan and Ceylon considering leaving the organisation; Canadian External Affairs Minister Lester Pearson told the Canadian House of Commons that the Commonwealth faced dissolution over Suez. Multilateral nuclear disarmament negotiations were also discussed.

This was the first Commonwealth Prime Ministers' Conference attended by Ghana, which had attained independence in March 1957.

Participants

References

1957 in London
1957
Diplomatic conferences in the United Kingdom
20th-century diplomatic conferences
1957 in international relations
1957 conferences
June 1957 events in the United Kingdom
July 1957 events in the United Kingdom
1950s in the City of Westminster
Harold Macmillan
Robert Menzies
John Diefenbaker
Kwame Nkrumah
Jawaharlal Nehru